SLL may refer to:

 Salalah Airport, Oman, IATA code
 Sierra Leonean leone, the currency of Sierra Leone
 Small lymphocytic lymphoma, a common form of leukemia
 Socialist Labour League, a Trotskyist political group in the United Kingdom
 Saint Lupicin Lions, an Intercrosse team located in Coteaux du Lion.
 SLL (South Korean company) (acronym for Studio LuluLala), South Korean drama production company